Nicolas Vanier (born 5 May 1962) is a French adventurer, writer and director.

His 2004 film The Last Trapper follows a trapper in Yukon, Canada.

His film,  ("Wolf") was released at the end of 2009 and was presented at the 2010 Cannes Film Festival. Loup is about the life of the Evens tribe in North Eastern arctic Siberia, in the Verkhoïansk mountain range, who live by raising large herds of reindeer (caribou), which involves protecting them from attacks by wolves.

In 2018, France Nature Environnement formally complained that a film crew overseen by Vanier had disturbed a colony of Greater Flamingoes, by repeatedly flying over them in an ultra-light aircraft, causing many - an estimated 11% of the total breeding population in France - to desert their nests and eggs.

Filmography
Les coureurs de bois (1982)
Au nord de l'hiver (1991)
L'enfant des neiges (1995)
Un hiver de chien (1997)
L'Odyssée blanche (2000)
The Last Trapper (2004)
L'Odyssée sibérienne (2006)
 (2009)
Belle et Sébastien (2013)
L'école buissonnière (2017)
Spread Your Wings (Donne-moi des ailes) - 2019

Bibliography
Le triathlon historique (1988)
Solitude nord (1990)
Transsibérie, le mythe sauvage (1992)
La vie en nord (1993)
Solitudes blanches (1994)
L'enfant des neiges (1995)
Otchum, l'extraordinaire aventure d'un chien de traîneaux (1996)
Nord, grand voyage dans le pays d'en haut (1997)
Robinson du froid (1997)
Un hiver sur les traces de Jack London (1997)
Destin nord (1998)
Territoire (1998)
Le grand brame (1998)
L'odyssée blanche (1999)
C'est encore loin l'Alaska (2000)
Le chant du grand nord (2002) - awarded the Prix Maurice Genevoix
Le voyageur du froid (2003)
L'or sous la neige (2004)
L'Odyssée sibérienne (26 October 2006)
Album illustré par Philippe Mignon (2006)
Guide de l'aventurier (2006)

References

External links
 Biography (French)
 
 Web site of the Loup movie (in French)

1962 births
20th-century French non-fiction writers
21st-century French non-fiction writers
French film directors
French male screenwriters
French screenwriters
Senegalese emigrants to France
Living people
Prix Maurice Genevoix winners
20th-century French male writers